The Machynlleth transmitting station is a broadcasting and telecommunications facility located on a hill about  west of the town of Machynlleth, in Powys, Wales. It was originally built by the BBC, entering service in June 1965 acting as a relay transmitter for the now-defunct 405-line VHF television system.

Specifications
The television broadcasts primarily covered the town of Machynlleth and the villages of the upper Dyfi river valley.

625-line colour TV came to the site in the late 1970s. A new  self-supporting lattice mast was built to carry the UHF aerials but the original VHF TV and VHF radio services continued to use the site's original wooden poles.

The three original VHF radio transmitters were upgraded to stereo in late Spring 1983.

The 405-line VHF television service closed across the UK in 1985, but Machynlleth's 405 line services closed a year early - in January 1984.

Machynlleth currently broadcasts digital television and analogue FM radio.

Services listed by frequency

Analogue television

28 June 1965 - Late 1970s

Late 1970s - 1 November 1982
Colour TV eventually arrived, with the site continuing to act as an off-air relay of Blaenplwyf for the 625-line services.

1 November 1982 - January 1984
Channel 4 launched across the UK on 1 November 1982. Being in Wales, Machynlleth broadcast the S4C variant.

January 1984 - 10 February 2010
405-line television was discontinued after 19 years of service. For the next 25 years there were to be no changes to the television output at this site.

Analogue and Digital Television

10 February 2010 - 10 March 2010
Digital switchover started at Blaenplwyf and therefore at Machynlleth and all its other relays. BBC 2 was closed down on channel 63 and BBC 1 was moved from channel 57 to channel 63 for its final month of service. Mux A started up on the newly vacated channel 57 at full post-DSO power of 4 W.

Digital Television

10 March 2010 - present
All the remaining analogue TV transmitters were shut down and the three multiplexes of Freeview Lite took over their frequencies.

Analogue radio (FM VHF)

28 June 1965 - Early 1990s
For its FM radio services, Machynlleth is an off-air relay of Blaenplwyf.

Early 1990s - present
Radio 1 gained its own frequency and National Radio 4 was added.

See also
List of masts
List of radio stations in the United Kingdom
List of tallest buildings and structures in Great Britain

References

External links
 MB21's page on BBC 405 TV to Wales and the West
 405 Alive's list of transmitters"
 More details on 405-line BBC transmitters
 The Transmission Gallery: Photographs and Information

Buildings and structures in Gwynedd
Transmitter sites in Wales
Pennal